WDEA (1370 AM) is a radio station broadcasting an adult standards format. Licensed to Ellsworth, Maine, United States, the station serves the Downeast Maine area. The station is owned by Townsquare Media and features programming from Westwood One's adult standards format called America's Best Music, with a local morning show hosted by Rick Foster. Previously, WDEA aired adult standards/MOR music from Citadel Media's Timeless.  WDEA carries news on-the-hour and news features from the CBS Radio Network and has been an affiliate of that network for many decades.

WDEA also broadcasts live Basketball coverage of all Mount Desert Island High School & Ellsworth High School games in addition to being a long-time affiliate of the Boston Red Sox Radio Network.

References

External links
AM 1370 WDEA Online

DEA
Adult standards radio stations in the United States
Radio stations established in 1958
Ellsworth, Maine
Townsquare Media radio stations
1958 establishments in Maine